Intrapersonal communication is a communicator's internal use of language or thought.

Talking to Myself may also refer to:

Books
 Talking to Myself, by Pearl Bailey (1971)
 Talking to Myself, by Studs Terkel (1973)

Television
Talking to Myself,  Season 4  Episode 20  The Lizzie Bennet Diaries
Talking to Myself,  Season 1  Episode 5  Wonderful You (TV series)

Music
Talking to Myself (album), by Patricia Conroy 2007
"Talking to Myself" (song), by Linkin Park 2017
"Talking to Myself", song by Michael Brecker from Don't Try This at Home (Michael Brecker album)
"Talking to Myself", song by Glenn Campbell from Country Music Star No. 1
"Talking to Myself", single by Cousteau (band)
"Talking to Myself", song by  Strung Out from Another Day in Paradise (album)
"Talking to Myself", single by Terraplane (band)  1985 
"Talking to Myself", song by Vinnie Barrett
"Talking to Myself", song by Gallant from Ology (album)
 "Talking To Myself" (Korean: 혼잣말) Lee Tae-sung 
"Talking to Myself", song by DJ Rap  
"Talking to Myself", song by the Adolescents La Vendetta... 2014  
"Talking to Myself", song by George Watsky 2016
"Talking to Myself", single by Otis Williams and the Charms 1957
"Talking to Myself", single by Eminem 2010